Gheorghe Csegezi (born 1900, date of death unknown) was a Romanian athlete. He competed in the men's decathlon at the 1928 Summer Olympics.

References

External links
 

1900 births
Year of death missing
Athletes (track and field) at the 1928 Summer Olympics
Romanian decathletes
Olympic athletes of Romania
Sportspeople from Brașov